Benjamin Bildstein (born 16 January 1992) is an Austrian sailor. He competed in the 49er event at the 2020 Summer Olympics, finishing 10th.

References

External links
 
 

1992 births
Living people
Austrian male sailors (sport)
Olympic sailors of Austria
Sailors at the 2020 Summer Olympics – 49er
Place of birth missing (living people)